Le Catogne is a mountain on the extreme north-eastern edge of the Mont Blanc massif, overlooking Champex in the Swiss canton of Valais. Some sources consider this summit as being within the Pennine Alps.

References

External links

Le Catogne on CampToCamp.org
 Le Catogne on Hikr

Mountains of the Alps
Mountains of Switzerland
Mountains of Valais
Two-thousanders of Switzerland
Mont Blanc massif